Psychonavigation 3 is a collaborative album by Bill Laswell and Pete Namlook, released on February 17, 1997, by FAX +49-69/450464.

Track listing

Personnel 
Adapted from the Psychonavigation 3 liner notes.
Bill Laswell – bass guitar, electronics
Pete Namlook – trautonium, electronics, producer, cover art

Release history

References

External links 
 Psychonavigation 3 at Bandcamp
 

1997 albums
Collaborative albums
Bill Laswell albums
Pete Namlook albums
FAX +49-69/450464 albums
Albums produced by Pete Namlook